E class tram may refer to:

E-class Melbourne tram
E-class Melbourne tram (first)
E type Adelaide tram
Sydney E-Class Tram